"Cry 'Havoc!', and let slip the dogs of war" is a quotation from William Shakespeare's play Julius Caesar (Act 3, Scene 1). The prase "cry havoc" also appears in two other Shakespeare plays, Coriolanus (Act 3, Scene 1) and King John (Act 2, Scene 1).

Cry havoc may refer to:

 [[Cry 'Havoc' (film)|Cry 'Havoc''' (film)]], a 1943 war drama
 Cry Havoc (1981 board game)
 Cry Havoc (2016 board game)
 Cry Havoc, an album by Destrophy
 "Cry Havoc" (Grimm), an episode of the TV series Grimm Cry Havoc, the autobiography of Simon Mann
 Cry Havoc: The Great American Bring-down and How It Happened, a book by Ralph de Toledano
 Cry Havoc!, a book by Beverley Nichols
 Cry Havok, title of volume 4 of the comic book series X-Men Blue''

See also
The Dogs of War (disambiguation)